Phintelloides is a genus of Asian jumping spiders erected by N. Kanesharatnam and Benjamin in 2019 after a molecular phylogenetic study of similar Asian Salticidae species. The single most likely cladogram shows that Phintelloides is sister to Phintella, with Proszynskia sister to both:

The name is a combination of the "Phintell", referring to the genus Phintella, and the Latin suffix "-oides", meaning "like".

Species
 it contains eleven species:
P. alborea Kanesharatnam & Benjamin, 2019 – Sri Lanka
P. brunne Kanesharatnam & Benjamin, 2019 – Sri Lanka
P. flavoviri Kanesharatnam & Benjamin, 2019 – Sri Lanka
P. flavumi Kanesharatnam & Benjamin, 2019 – Sri Lanka
P. jesudasi (Caleb & Mathai, 2014) (type) – India, Sri Lanka
P. manipur Caleb, 2020 – India
P. orbisa Kanesharatnam & Benjamin, 2019 – Sri Lanka
P. pengi Wang & Li, 2021 – China
P. singhi (Monga, Singh & Sadana, 1989) – India
P. undulatus (Caleb & Karthikeyani, 2015) – India
P. versicolor (C. L. Koch, 1846) – Pakistan, India, Myanmar, Thailand, Malaysia, China, Taiwan, Korea, Taiwan, Japan, Indonesia (Sumatra). Introduced to USA (Hawaii)

See also
 Phintella
 Chrysilla
 Proszynskia
 List of Salticidae genera

References

Further reading

Salticidae genera